Cory Brandon (born October 5, 1987) is an American football offensive tackle for the Calgary Stampeders of the Canadian Football League (CFL). He signed with the Tampa Bay Buccaneers as an undrafted free agent in 2011. He played college football at Oklahoma.

He has also been a member of the Chicago Bears, Seattle Seahawks and BC Lions.

Early years
He was a first-team all-state after his senior season and also earned all-area and all-district honors after his junior season at Corsicana high school.

College career
He played College football at Oklahoma. He played 13 games and started 7 of them his Junior season.

Professional career

Tampa Bay Buccaneeers
On July 27, 2011, he signed with the Tampa Bay Buccaneers as an undrafted free agent. On September 4, 2011, he was released.

Chicago Bears
On June 18, 2012, Brandon signed with the Chicago Bears. On August 31, 2012, he was released on the day of roster cuts. On September 1, 2012, he was signed to the practice squad. On September 10, he was released from the practice squad. On October 17, 2012, he was re-signed to the practice squad. On December 17, 2012, he was promoted to the active roster from the practice squad after the team placed defensive tackle Matt Toeaina on Injured Reserve.

Arizona Cardinals
Brandon signed with the Arizona Cardinals on May 27, 2014.

Seattle Seahawks
After the Cardinals waived him, the Seattle Seahawks claimed Brandon off waivers on August 4, 2014. The Seahawks released Brandon on August 25, 2014.

BC Lions
Brandon signed with the BC Lions on August 31, 2014.

Tampa Bay Storm
Brandon was assigned to the Tampa Bay Storm of the Arena Football League on October 2, 2014.

Calgary Stampeders
Brandon signed with the Calgary Stampeders on March 18, 2015.

References

External links
Oklahoma Sooners bio
Seattle Seahawks bio
Chicago Bear bio

1987 births
Living people
American football offensive tackles
Oklahoma Sooners football players
Tampa Bay Buccaneers players
Spokane Shock players
Chicago Bears players
Arizona Cardinals players
Seattle Seahawks players
Tampa Bay Storm players
Players of American football from Texas